Joseph Kesenge Wandangakongu (4 April 1928 in Molegbe – 19 February 2021 in Gbadolite) was the Democratic Republic of the Congo Roman Catholic bishop of the Roman Catholic Diocese of Molegbe.

Wandangakonga was born in the Democratic Republic of the Congo and was ordained to the priesthood in 1957. He served as bishop of the Diocese of Molegbe from 1969 until 1997.

Notes

1928 births
2021 deaths
20th-century Roman Catholic bishops in the Democratic Republic of the Congo
People from the province of Équateur
Roman Catholic bishops of Molegbe
21st-century Democratic Republic of the Congo people